Jordanita globulariae, also known as the scarce forester, is a day-flying moth of the family Zygaenidae.

Distribution
It is found from the western part of the Iberian Peninsula through western, central and eastern Europe to the Ural. In the south, the range extends through the Balkan Peninsula to north-western Turkey.

Description
The length of the forewings is 10.5–17 mm for males and 7.7–10.1 mm for females. Like the cistus forester, the adult moth is iridescent blue green with dark legs and antennae. It is found on sunny days flying in chalk or limestone grassland.

The larvae feed on Centaurea (knapweed) species, Cirsium tuberosum (tuberous thistle) and Globularia species.

References

External links
Lepiforum e. V.

Procridinae
Moths of Asia
Moths of Europe
Moths described in 1793